Oli is a surname in Nepal and India. Oli’s are referred to in Nepal as Kumai Bahuns (Kumaoni Brahmans)
Notable people with the name include:

Khadga Prasad Oli, Nepalese Prime Minister
Komal Oli, Nepalese singer and politician

Ethnic groups in Nepal
Bahun
Nepali-language surnames
Surnames of Nepalese origin
Khas surnames